The McCutcheon index or chemotactic ratio is the ratio of the net displacement of a bacterium to the length of its actual path.

It is named after Morton McCutcheon who introduced it to describe chemotaxis in leukocytes.

References

Biophysics